Maple Grove Cemetery may refer to:

Maple Grove Cemetery (Queens), New York City, New York, listed on the National Register of Historic Places in Queens County, New York
Maple Grove Cemetery (Mason, Michigan), listed on the National Register of Historic Places in Ingham County, Michigan
Maple Grove Cemetery, Frewsburg, New York
Maple Grove Cemetery, Hoosick Falls, New York